Oryba achemenides is a moth of the  family Sphingidae.

Distribution 
It is found from Central America to the Amazon region, including Belize, Guatemala, Costa Rica, Suriname, Venezuela, Brazil and Bolivia.

Description 
The wingspan is 100–120 mm. It is a large, heavy-bodied and large-eyed species with a dark green upperside and orange underside. The marginal band of the forewing upperside is much narrower than the distance between this area and the distal margin of the dark olive-green median trapezoidal area. There are no distinct bands on the hindwing upperside.

Biology 
There are probably multiple generations per year.

References

Dilophonotini
Moths described in 1779